The Guaranty Building is a historic site in West Palm Beach, Florida. It is located at 120 South Olive Avenue.

It was deemed historically significant as "it was the biggest real estate investment in the history of West Palm Beach" at the time of its construction in 1922, and also for its association with architect Henry Stephen Harvey.

On December 10, 1998, it was added to the U.S. National Register of Historic Places.

References

External links
 Palm Beach County listings at National Register of Historic Places
 Guaranty Building at Florida's Office of Cultural and Historical Programs

National Register of Historic Places in Palm Beach County, Florida
Buildings and structures in West Palm Beach, Florida